HMS Marmion was a  which served with the Royal Navy during World War I. The M class were an improvement on the previous , capable of higher speed. Launched in May 1915, the ship served as part of the Grand Fleet on exercises and escort duty. For much of the war, it was commanded by William Leveson-Gower, the future uncle to Elizabeth II. There were no survivors.

Design and development
Marmion was one of sixteen  destroyers ordered by the British Admiralty in September 1914 as part of the First War Construction Programme. The M class was an improved version of the earlier  destroyers, required to reach a higher speed in order to counter rumoured German fast destroyers. It transpired that the German ships did not exist.

Two funnels were fitted, two boilers exhausting through the forward funnel.

Armament consisted of three single QF  Mk IV guns on the ship's centreline, with one on the forecastle, one aft on a raised platform and one between the middle and aft funnels. Torpedo armament consisted of two twin mounts for  torpedoes. A single QF 2-pounder  "pom-pom" anti-aircraft gun was mounted between the torpedo tubes. After February 1916 Marmion was equipped with two chutes for depth charges for anti-submarine warfare. The ship had a complement of 77 officers and ratings.

Construction and career
Construction by Swan Hunter & Wigham Richardson was started when the ship's hull was laid down on 28 October 1914 at Wallsend with yard number 977. The ship was launched on 28 May the following year. Initially allocated the pennant number H.C2, the ship became G04 in January 1917.

Commissioned on 3 September 1915, Marmion joined the Eleventh Destroyer Flotilla of the Grand Fleet.  Within a month, William Leveson-Gower, who would become uncle to the future Elizabeth II, was appointed as commander.  He remained in charge of the vessel until 25 May 1917.

The vessel was initially deployed as part of the Grand Fleet. On 21 December 1916, while undertaking exercises, the flotilla leader  collided with the destroyer . Five officers and forty-five ratings lost their lives. The ship then took Hoste in tow, along with fellow M-class destroyer , but that vessel too had to be abandoned once the crew had been evacuated.

Marmion also undertook escort duties. The mission encountered heavy seas that caused substantial damage, but was a success.

In October 1917, Marmion was one of eight destroyers that were escorting convoys between Shetland and Norway. On 20 October, the vessel was sent to escort an outbound convoy heading for Bergen to replace  which was returning for repairs. At 1:30AM on 21 October, Marmion encountered this second convoy rather than the one it was expecting to see, which was at the time some miles north. The ships were passing when Tirade collided with Marmion. The bow of the former vessel was raised by a particularly high swell and sliced Marmion in half. The ship swiftly sank with all hands. Only ten bodies were recovered.

References

Citations

Bibliography

 
 
 
 
 
 

 

 
 

1915 ships
Admiralty M-class destroyers
Maritime incidents in 1917
Ships built on the River Tyne
Ships sunk in collisions
World War I destroyers of the United Kingdom
World War I shipwrecks in the North Sea
Warships lost with all hands